Trevoh Tom Chalobah (born 5 July 1999) is an English professional footballer who plays as a centre-back or defensive midfielder for  club Chelsea. 

Chalobah joined Chelsea in 2007 at the age of eight, joining his brother Nathaniel in the club's academy. He spent time out on loan at Ipswich Town, Huddersfield Town and French side Lorient. He made his senior debut for Chelsea in the 2021 UEFA Super Cup, helping the club lift the trophy following a penalty shoot-out win.

He has represented England at various youth levels from U16 to U21 level. In 2017, he helped England win the 2017 UEFA European Under-19 Championship.

Club career

Chelsea

Early career

Born in Freetown, Sierra Leone, Chalobah joined Chelsea at the age of eight. He signed his first professional contract with Chelsea in June 2016 and signed a new contract in March 2018. His youth honours at Chelsea include the UEFA Youth League in 2015–16, the FA Youth Cup in 2015–16 and 2016–17, and the Under-18 Premier League in 2016–17.

He was named by Antonio Conte as a substitute for the 2018 FA Cup Final victory against Manchester United on 19 May 2018 at Wembley Stadium despite never having previously played a professional game. Chelsea won the match 1–0, and Chalobah did not enter the field.

2018–19 season: Loan to Ipswich Town
He signed for Championship club Ipswich Town on a season-long loan deal in June 2018. He made his professional debut on 4 August, starting in a 2–2 draw with Blackburn Rovers. Two weeks later he scored his first senior goal, equalising in a 1–1 draw with Aston Villa at Portman Road. On 6 October, he scored a late winner in a 3–2 win against Swansea City, earning Ipswich their first league win of the season. Despite primarily playing as a centre-back during his time in the Chelsea academy, he played as a central midfielder for Ipswich during his first season in senior football. Chalobah featured regularly for Ipswich during the 2018–19 season, playing 44 matches and scoring 2 goals for the team, who were relegated to League One.

2019–20 season: Loan to Huddersfield Town
On 8 August 2019, Chalobah signed a new contract with Chelsea through to the 2022 season, and began a season-long loan at Huddersfield Town. He made his debut five days later in a 1–0 home loss to Lincoln City in the first round of the EFL Cup, playing the full 90 minutes. He scored his first goal for Huddersfield on 21 August against Cardiff City, initially equalising to level the score at 1–1, in a match that Huddersfield went on to lose 1–2. He made 38 appearances in all competitions for Huddersfield during the season, scoring once.

2020–21 season: Loan to Lorient 
On 18 August 2020, Chalobah signed a new contract with Chelsea until 2023 and joined French side Lorient on loan for the 2020–21 season. He made his league debut as a substitute on 13 September, in a 3–2 loss against RC Lens. He scored his first goal for Lorient on 27 January, netting the opening goal in a 3–2 win against Dijon. Chalobah had another productive loan spell at Lorient, scoring 2 goals in 30 appearances, including scoring on the final day of the season in a 1–1 draw against Strasbourg.

2021–22 season
On 11 August 2021, Chalobah made his debut for Chelsea in the 2021 UEFA Super Cup against Villarreal, as his side won 6–5 in a penalty shoot-out after the match finished in a 1–1 draw after extra time. Three days later, Chalobah made his Premier League debut in Chelsea's opening match of the season against Crystal Palace where he also scored his first ever Premier League goal in a 3–0 win.

On 4 November 2021, Chalobah signed a new contract with Chelsea, keeping him at the club until 2026. On 23 November, Chalobah scored his first UEFA Champions League goal, netting the opener in a 4–0 home win against Juventus at Stamford Bridge.

2022–23 season
On 29 October 2022, Chalobah scored an own goal in Chelsea's 4–1 defeat away to Brighton & Hove Albion in the Premier League. This was the first defeat in Chalobah's Chelsea career.

International career
He has represented England at youth level from Under-16 up to Under-20, captaining all four teams at various stages. In November 2014, Chalobah captained the England under-16 team against Scotland in the Victory Shield. In May 2016, Chalobah was captain of the England under-17 team that lost to Spain in the quarter-final of the 2016 UEFA European Under-17 Championship.

Chalobah was included in the England under-19 squad for the 2017 UEFA European Under-19 Championship. An ankle injury sustained in the final group game against Germany ruled him out for the rest of the tournament. England went on to defeat Portugal in the final.

On 30 August 2019, Chalobah was included in the England U21 squad for the first time and made his debut during the 3–2 2021 UEFA European Under-21 Championship qualifying win against Turkey on 6 September 2019.

Personal life
Born in Freetown, Sierra Leone, Chalobah moved to the United Kingdom at the age of two and grew up in Gipsy Hill in the London Borough of Lambeth. His brother Nathaniel Chalobah is also a professional footballer, who plays for West Bromwich Albion, having also previously played for Chelsea.

Career statistics

Honours
Chelsea
FA Cup: 2017–18; runner-up: 2021–22
UEFA Super Cup: 2021
FIFA Club World Cup: 2021
EFL Cup runner-up: 2021–22

England U19
UEFA European Under-19 Championship: 2017

References

External links

Profile at the Chelsea F.C. website

1999 births
Living people
Sportspeople from Freetown
English footballers
Association football defenders
Association football midfielders
Chelsea F.C. players
Ipswich Town F.C. players
Huddersfield Town A.F.C. players
FC Lorient players
English Football League players
Ligue 1 players
Premier League players
FA Cup Final players
England youth international footballers
England under-21 international footballers
English expatriate footballers
Expatriate footballers in France
English expatriate sportspeople in France
Black British sportsmen
English sportspeople of Sierra Leonean descent
Sierra Leonean emigrants to the United Kingdom